The  San Diego Chargers season was the franchise's 34th season in the National Football League (NFL), its 44rth overall and the second under head coach Marty Schottenheimer. They finished the campaign last in their division with only four wins and earned the #1 pick in the 2004 NFL draft. They played one “home” game during the season, against the Miami Dolphins, at Sun Devil Stadium in Tempe, Arizona where the Arizona Cardinals played, due to the Cedar Fire. The team declined from the previous season, as the Chargers won four games and surrendered the second most points per game (27.6), trailing only the Arizona Cardinals during the season. On April 11, 2003 general manager John Butler died from lymphoma and A.J. Smith a former assistant to Butler took over the position for the next 10 seasons, during the season the Chargers wore a patch on their jerseys with the initials "JB" to commemorate John Butler.

NFL Draft

Personnel

Staff

Roster

Schedule 
In addition to their regular games with AFC West rivals, the Chargers played teams from the AFC North and NFC North as per the schedule rotation, and also played intraconference games against the Jaguars and the Dolphins based on divisional positions from 2002.

Oddly, this season marked the first time that the Chargers played the Jaguars, despite that team existing since 1995. This occurred due to old NFL scheduling formulas in place prior to 2002, whereby teams had no rotating schedule opposing members of other divisions within their own conference, but played interdivisional conference games according to position within a season’s table. The Chargers played the Tennessee Titans only once during this period (in 1998) but played the Bengals five times during these years.

In preceding years, even longer gaps between two teams playing each other had occurred. For instance the Jets never opposed the Cardinals between 1979 and 1995 inclusive.

The Week 8 home game against the Miami Dolphins was relocated to Sun Devil Stadium in Tempe, Arizona due to a massive wildfire that turned Qualcomm Stadium into an evacuation site.

Note: Intra-division opponents are in bold text.

Standings

References 

San Diego Chargers
San Diego Chargers seasons
San Diego